Bourne Park Reed Beds is a 7.4 hectare Local Nature Reserve on the southern outskirts of Ipswich in Suffolk, United Kingdom. It is owned and managed by Ipswich Borough Council.

This nature reserve in Bourne Park is a linear area of reed beds, scrub woodland and tall herb fen, along the north bank of Belstead Brook.

References

Local Nature Reserves in Suffolk